Charlie Is My Darling, directed by Peter Whitehead and produced by the Rolling Stones' manager Andrew Loog Oldham, was the first documentary film about the Rolling Stones. It was intended as a screen test for the band, to see how their musical charisma would translate into film. The footage was shot during the band's second tour of Ireland that year, on 3 and 4 September 1965, and was finished in the spring of 1966. It was given its premiere at the Mannheim Film Festival in October 1966. But the film was never officially released, due to the legal fights between the Rolling Stones and Allen Klein and a burglary in Andrew Loog Oldham's office, which saw all prints disappear.

Nearly fifty years later, in 2012, a new film using restored footage and entitled Charlie Is My Darling – Ireland 1965 was released by Allen Klein's ABKCO Records, which owns the rights to all older Stones material. Charlie Is My Darling – Ireland 1965 came about when director Michael Gochanour discovered additional unprocessed footage of the 1965 Rolling Stones screen test. Gochanour spent two years editing and remixing the '60s material, adding a story line and synching music to Rolling Stones concert footage that had originally been filmed without sound. The result was Charlie Is My Darling – 1965. One of Gochanour's objectives in making the film was "to show The Rolling Stones in a way the world had never seen them before; as a band just coming into their own – raw, visceral, innocent and with purpose."

The 64-minute documentary, Charlie Is My Darling – Ireland 1965, follows the group from their car trip out of London to Heathrow Airport, and from there to Dublin where they had two concerts at the Adelphi Theatre on 3 September. The next day they take a train up to Belfast for two concerts at the ABC Theatre, before returning to London by plane the following day. Besides stage shots from the concerts (where the second Dublin concert ends in total chaos as fans storm the stage), the film contains scenes from a hotel room in Dublin (where Keith and Mick for fun do a few Beatles songs as well as a couple of their own), scenes from their train trip to Belfast, another impromptu song session by a piano (with both Keith and Andrew Oldham playing the piano while Mick impersonates Elvis Presley singing "Santa Bring My Baby Back (To Me)" and Fats Domino's version of "Blueberry Hill"), and finally their flight back to London. Intermixed with this are interviews with the band members where they talk about fame, fans and future.
 
Charlie Is My Darling – Ireland 1965 premiered at the Walter Reade Theater in New York City on 29 September 2012, as part of the 2012 New York Film Festival, and was released on DVD and Blu-ray in November 2012. On 25 November 2012, it was shown by BBC Two as part of BBC's "The Rolling Stones at 50" celebrations.

Soundtrack
A Super Deluxe Edition box set of the film versions and audio albums was released 13 November 2012 which contained 2 CDs, 10" vinyl, DVD, Blu-ray and a numbered limited edition enlarged film cell in 200+ unique variations.

Live 1965: Music From Charlie Is My Darling, the audio album featuring the songs in the documentary, was released 24 November 2014 on ABKCO Records as a stand-alone release as a digital download and streaming audio.

Track listing

Awards
The album won the Grammy Award for Best Historical Album at 2014’s 56th Annual Grammy Awards.

Charts

References

External links
 
Variety, 26 October 1966: Charlie is My Darling, review. Retrieved 2 December 2012
The Arts Desk, 26 November 2012: The Story of Charlie Is My Darling. Retrieved 2 December 2012
 Official website for the new, restored version. Retrieved 2 December 2012
Ultimate Classic Rock, November 2012: "The Rolling Stones, Charlie is My Darling – Ireland 1965" – DVD review. Retrieved 2 December 2012
 Richard Brody, The New Yorker, 3 October 2012: "Charlie is My Darling": The Rolling Stones in 1965. Retrieved 2 December 2012

1966 films
1966 documentary films
1966 independent films
Black-and-white documentary films
British documentary films
British independent films
Films shot in Ireland
Rockumentaries
The Rolling Stones documentary films
1960s English-language films
1960s British films